Miloš Koprivica (born 24 March 1995) is a Serbian professional basketball player for Sutjeska of the Montenegrin Basketball League.

References

External links
 Player profile at draftexpress.com
 Player profile at eurobasket.com

1995 births
Living people
ABA League players
Basketball League of Serbia players
Bosnia and Herzegovina expatriate basketball people in Serbia
Centers (basketball)
KK Lovćen players
KK Mega Basket players
KK Partizan players
KK Podgorica players
KK Sloboda Užice players
KK Sutjeska players
People from Sokolac
Serbian expatriate basketball people in Montenegro
Serbian men's basketball players
Serbs of Bosnia and Herzegovina